Dasht-e Hasani-ye Yek (also Romanized as Dasht-e Ḩasanī-ye Yek) is a village in Juyom Rural District, Juyom District, Larestan County, Fars Province, Iran. At the 2006 census, its population was 42, in 9 families.

References 

Populated places in Larestan County